Philip I was king of the ancient Greek kingdom of Macedonia. He was a member of the Argead dynasty and son of Argaeus I. By allowing thirty years for the span of an average generation from the beginning of Archelaus' reign in 413 BC, British historian Nicholas Hammond estimated that Philip ruled around 593 BC.

As king, Philip was noted to be both wise and courageous. He resisted successive invasions by the Illyrians, but was eventually killed in battle against them, leaving the crown to his infant son, Aeropus I. Philip's wife is unknown.

Very little is known of Philip I due to his early status as a king of Macedon. However, his family line would eventually lead to Alexander the Great.

References

Notes

Citations

7th-century BC Macedonian monarchs
Argead kings of Macedonia
Old Macedonian kingdom
Year of birth unknown